Broderick 'Brock' Adrianus Hekking (born October 6, 1991) is a former American football linebacker. He played college football at Nevada.

College career

Hekking played college football at Nevada, where was named Second-team All-Mountain West twice.

Professional career
Hekking was signed by the Chargers as an undrafted free agent in 2015. He was placed on injured reserve on September 1, 2015. He was placed on injured reserve again on May 17, 2016, missing two straight seasons.

On March 14, 2017, Hekking was waived by the Chargers with a failed physical designation.

References

External links
 https://web.archive.org/web/20150616045340/http://www.chargers.com/team/players/roster/brock-hekking

Living people
People from Vacaville, California
American football linebackers
Nevada Wolf Pack football players
San Diego Chargers players
1991 births
Los Angeles Chargers players